Mhudi: An Epic of South African Native Life a Hundred Years Ago is a South African novel by Sol Plaatje first published in 1930, and one of the first published African novels by a black African to be published in English. The novel was republished many times subsequently, including in the influential Heinemann African Writers Series.

The novel is a political historical novel which explores the development of the Traansval kingdom, led by Matabeleland. The novel was originally finished in 1920, but Plaatje was unable to get the novel published. The novel re-invisions the standard Euro-centric narrative of history which supported Apartheid and its racist infrastructure.

Plaatje described the novel as a romance, comparing it to Zulu novels of H. Rider Haggard.

Further reading

References

See also 
Guanya Pau: A Story of an African Princess 1891 Liberian English language novel

1930 novels
South African historical novels
20th-century South African novels
Novels set in South Africa
African Writers Series